Clinus arborescens is a species of clinid that occurs in temperate waters of the Indian Ocean around South Africa.  This species can reach a length of  SL. It is a demersal species, found in beds of Rhodophyta where it feeds on small molluscs.

References

arborescens
Fish described in 1908
Taxa named by John Dow Fisher Gilchrist
Taxa named by William Wardlaw Thompson